Cameron Gray may refer to:
 Cameron Gray (footballer)
 Cameron Gray (swimmer)